Nova Erechim is a municipality in the state of Santa Catarina in the South region of Brazil. It was created in 1964, its area being taken from the existing municipality of Saudades.

See also
List of municipalities in Santa Catarina

References

Municipalities in Santa Catarina (state)